Dustin Beurer is an American football coach. He is the head football coach at Northwood University in Midland, Michigan, the 2023 will be his first season with Northwood. Dustin Beurer was formerly the head football coach at Albion College in Albion, Michigan from 2019 through the 2022 season.

Coaching career

Albion
Beurer was named head coach of Albion on September 6, 2018. He was promoted from his roles as assistant head coach, offensive coordinator, and recruiting coordinator to succeed longtime head coach Craig Rundle, who retired.

Northwood University
According to reports from Footballscoop.com Dustin Beurer has been named the new head football coach at Northwood University, in Midland Michigan as of December 15, 2022. |url=https://footballscoop.com/news/sources-northwood-lands-accomplished-d-iii-coach-to-lead-program |

Head coaching record

References

External links
 Albion profile

Year of birth missing (living people)
Living people
American football offensive linemen
Albion Britons football coaches
Albion Britons football players
Morehead State Eagles football coaches
Morehead State University alumni
People from Lenawee County, Michigan
Coaches of American football from  Michigan
Players of American football from  Michigan